Guangzhou No.7 High School (:zh:广州市第七中学), located in the southern Chinese city of Guangzhou (Canton), was founded in 1888.

High schools in Guangdong
Educational institutions established in 1888
Yuexiu District
1888 establishments in China